Yablochko (in english "little apple" ) is a  of chastushka style and dance, traditionally presented as sailors' dance.

The choreographed version of the dance first appeared in the 1926 Reinhold Glière ballet The Red Poppy and from there is known in the West as the Russian Sailors Dance.

There is not any single song under this name, although numerous texts are known, their common part being only its tune and the signature lines starting with "Эх, яблочко..." ("Ekh, Yablochko", "Ekh, little apple") (also numerous versions: "Ekh little apple, where are you rolling?", "Ekh little apple on the saucer", etc., depending on the subsequent rhyme).  A great number of verses of this kind proliferated during the Russian Civil War, in Red, Black and White camps. The song itself has nothing to do with apples, with its verse commonly being related to the political issues of the time.

Researchers believe that the "Yablochko" dance appeared as a synthesis of the British and Ireland hornpipe dance and Russian traditional dance.

References

Russian folk songs
Russian folk dances
Anarchist songs